The 1993 NCAA Women's Division I Swimming and Diving Championships were contested at the 12th annual NCAA-sanctioned swim meet to determine the team and individual national champions of Division I women's collegiate swimming and diving in the United States. 

This year's events were hosted at the University Aquatic Center at the University of Minnesota in Minneapolis, Minnesota. 

Stanford repeated as team champions, finishing 228.5 points ahead of Florida in the point standings. It was the Cardinal's second consecutive and fourth overall team title.

Team standings
Note: Top 10 only
(H) = Hosts
(DC) = Defending champions
Full results

See also
List of college swimming and diving teams

References

NCAA Division I Swimming And Diving Championships
NCAA Division I Swimming And Diving Championships
NCAA Division I Women's Swimming and Diving Championships